Lee Tae-gon (Korean: 이태곤; born November 27, 1977) is a South Korean actor.

Personal life 
Lee attended Kyonggi University, where he studied Physical Education, majoring in swimming, he was a qualified swimming instructor before entering the entertainment industry. Lee has two older sisters. He is also a very keen fisherman, often catching large breams.

Career
On December 16, 2011, Lee was honored with the Grand Prize for his work in Gwanggaeto, The Great Conqueror at the 19th Korean Culture & Entertainment Awards. He was additionally nominated for the KBS Drama Awards Top Excellence Award and the Daesang, or Artist of the Year, in recognition of his portrayal as the king in the Korean Broadcasting System historical saga Gwanggaeto, The Great Conqueror. The awards were held on December 31, 2011.

Filmography

Television appearances 
 Dear Heaven (SBS, 2005)
 Yeon Gae Somun as Yeon Gae Somun (young adult) (SBS, 2006)
 Winter Bird as Jung Do Hyun (MBC, 2007)
 Detective Mr. Lee (MegaTV, 2008)
 My Life's Golden Age as Dong Han (MBC, 2008)
 Assorted Gems (also known as Jewel Bibimbap) as Seo Yeong-guk (MBC, 2009) 
 Golden Fish as Lee Tae Young (MBC, 2010)
 Gwanggaeto, The Great Conqueror as Dam Duk/Gwanggaeto the Great (KBS1, 2011)
 One Well-Raised Daughter as Han Yoo-chan (SBS, 2013)
 Love (ft. Marriage and Divorce) as Shin Yoo-shin (TV Chosun, 2021–2022) - Season 1–2

Television Shows 
 City Sashimi Restaurant (2023) - Chef 
 Middle class 4 (2022) - Host 
Trust Me and Follow Me, Urban Fishermen 4 (2022) - Cast Member 
 Stars' Top Recipe at Fun-Staurant (2022) - Cast Member 
 Fan Heart Contest ( 2022) - Host 
 Law of the Jungle in Siberia - 2012 - Cast member, Ep. 23-28
 I Live Alone - Cast member, - Ep. 69-111
 Law of the Jungle in Brunei - 2015 - Cast member, Ep. 175-177
 Law of the Jungle in Papua New Guinea - 2016 - Cast member, Ep. 216-219
 Law of the Jungle in Fiji - 2017 - Cast member, Ep. 288-292
 Battle Trip - 2017 - contestant with Kangnam, Eps. 65-67
  Radio Star (TV series) - 2017 - Guest, Ep. 525
Everybody's Kitchen - Guest, Ep. 4
Law of the Jungle in Northern Mariana Islands - 2018 - Cast member, Ep. 349-452
A Man Who Feeds The Dog - Cast member

Awards and nominations

Won 
 2005 SBS Drama Awards: New Star Award
 2010 MBC Drama Awards: PD Award, Golden Fish
 2011 KBS Drama Awards: Excellence Award, Actor in a Serial Drama, King Gwanggaeto the Great
 2019 SBS Entertainment Awards: Best Challenge Award, in variety show, Law of the Jungle

Nominated 
 2009 MBC Drama Awards: Best Couple Award with Go Na-eun, Assorted Gems
 2010 MBC Drama Awards: Top Excellence Award, Actor, Golden Fish
 2010 MBC Drama Awards: Grand Prize, Golden Fish
 2011 KBS Drama Awards: Top Excellence Award, Actor, King Gwanggaeto the Great
 2014 SBS Drama Awards: Excellence Award, Actor in a Serial Drama, One Well-Raised Daughter

References

External links 

 

1977 births
Living people
South Korean male film actors
South Korean male television actors